Kwon Tong-hyok (born January 30, 1985) is a North Korean sport shooter. Kwon represented North Korea at the 2008 Summer Olympics in Beijing, where he competed in the men's 10 m air pistol, along with his teammate Kim Jong-Su. He finished only in twenty-sixth place by two points ahead of Belarus' Kanstantsin Lukashyk from the final attempt, for a total score of 575 targets.

References

External links
NBC 2008 Olympics profile

North Korean male sport shooters
Living people
Olympic shooters of North Korea
Shooters at the 2008 Summer Olympics
1985 births
Shooters at the 2010 Asian Games
Asian Games competitors for North Korea